|}

The Derrinstown Stud Derby Trial is a Group 3 flat horse race in Ireland open to three-year-old thoroughbreds. It is run over a distance of 1 mile and 2 furlongs (2,012 metres) at Leopardstown in May.

History
Established in 1971, the event was originally called the Nijinsky Stakes. It was named after Nijinsky, the previous year's Irish-trained English Triple Crown winner.

For a period the Nijinsky Stakes held Group 2 status. It was open to older horses for several years from the mid-1970s.

The race was renamed the Derby Trial Stakes in 1984. From this point it was sponsored by Derrinstown Stud. It was downgraded to Group 3 level in the early 1990s, and promoted back to Group 2 in 2003. It was downgraded again to Group 3 status in 2014.

The Derrinstown Stud Derby Trial can serve as a trial for the Epsom Derby. The last horse to win both races was High Chaparral in 2002. The last winner to achieve victory in the Irish Derby was Fame and Glory in 2009.

The title "Nijinsky Stakes" was later assigned to a different race at Leopardstown, a Listed event for three-year-olds in June which was known as the King George V Cup from 2013 to 2019.

Records

Leading jockey (8 wins):
 Christy Roche – Ballymore (1973), Noelino (1979), Toca Madera (1986), St Jovite (1992), Perfect Imposter (1993), Truth or Dare (1996), Ashley Park (1997), Risk Material (1998)

Leading trainer (15 wins):
 Aidan O'Brien – Risk Material (1998), Galileo (2001), High Chaparral (2002), Yeats (2004), Dylan Thomas (2006), Archipenko (2007), Fame and Glory (2009), Midas Touch (2010), Recital (2011), Battle of Marengo (2013), Douglas Macarthur (2017), Broome (2019), Cormorant (2020), Bolshoi Ballet (2021), Stone Age (2022)

Winners

See also
 Horse racing in Ireland
 List of Irish flat horse races

References

 Paris-Turf:
 Racing Post:

 galopp-sieger.de – Derby Trial Stakes.
 galopp-sieger.de – Nijinsky Stakes.
 ifhaonline.org – International Federation of Horseracing Authorities – Derrinstown Stud Derby Trial (2019).
 irishracinggreats.com – Derrinstown Stud Derby Trial Stakes (Group 2).
 pedigreequery.com – Derrinstown Stud Derby Trial Stakes – Leopardstown.
 pedigreequery.com – Nijinsky Stakes – Leopardstown.

Flat horse races for three-year-olds
Leopardstown Racecourse
Flat races in Ireland
Recurring sporting events established in 1971
1971 establishments in Ireland